Christina Aistrup Hansen (born 1984) is a former Danish nurse who was charged with the murder of three patients and attempted manslaughter at the Nykøbing Falster Hospital.

In June 2016, the nurse was sentenced for four murders and attempted murder, according to section 237 of the Danish Penal Code. In addition, she was deprived of her authorization as a nurse. The court in Nykøbing found it proven that Hansen had given her sick and weak patients lethal doses of morphine and diazepam. The case in the city court extended over 27 days and involved more than 70 witnesses. At the time of the judgment, the nurse appealed to the national court for a declaration of dismissal.

In May 2017, she was convicted of a single jury trial by the Østre Landsret for three murders and was instead found guilty of attempted manslaughter in four cases. On this basis, the court changed Hansen's punishment from life to 12 years in prison. The reason for the change was, in particular, a forensic and evidence-specific detail: although it was found that Hansen's medical abuse on patients did not occur "in treatment or pain relievers by mistake", the technical evidence was not strong enough to confirm the verdict. The Legal Service Council reviewed the medical information and concluded that it was not possible to be fully sure that the morphine and diazepam injections were the direct causes of death.

In addition to these charges, Hansen was found guilty of giving her own 7-year-old daughter strong and prescripted sleeping medicine that is dangerous for children and only suitable for adults.

A forensic psychological evaluation determined that Hansen suffered from histrionic personality disorder. A person suffering from this disorder is capable of going to extreme lengths for positive attention. All this and violent self-absorption, which includes narcissism, often makes the person conduct acts towards others so they can be in the center of attention.

The nurse's personality disorder was seen by the prosecution as one of the main motives behind the killings. Prosecutor Michael Boelsen stated to the court that "the defendant has arranged themselves as the main role character in a bizarre play where the patients are her extras". Although she was described as proficient, the psychiatric report showed that the she had average intelligence. Boelsen stated in this context that "she [Hansen] has used her professional insight in a deeply perverted way, which was driven by her histrionic personality disorder".

See also 

 List of serial killers by country

References 

1984 births
21st-century Danish criminals
Danish female serial killers
Danish nurses
Living people
Medical serial killers
People with histrionic personality disorder
Poisoners